HP Warta is a handball club, based on Hisingen in Gothenburg, Sweden. The male team have played 16 seasons in Elitserien. The female team won Elitserien regular season 1997. Their home venue is Lundbystrand.

Kits

Sports Hall information

Name: – Lundbystrand
City: – Göteborg
Capacity: – 1500
Address: – Anders Carlssons gata 10, 417 55 Göteborg, Sweden

Famous former players 
 Tommy Atterhäll
 Martin Boquist
 Per Carlén
 Martin Frändesjö
 Mia Hermansson-Högdahl
 Johan Jakobsson
 Christer Magnusson

External links 
 
 

Sports clubs in Gothenburg
Swedish handball clubs
Handball clubs established in 1972
Hisingen
1972 establishments in Sweden